Gravina Island is an island within Chugach National Forest in Prince William Sound.

References

Islands of Alaska
Islands of Chugach Census Area, Alaska
Islands of Unorganized Borough, Alaska